Rust and Bone is a 2012 romantic drama film directed by Jacques Audiard, starring Marion Cotillard and Matthias Schoenaerts, based on Craig Davidson's short story collection Rust and Bone. It tells the story of an unemployed 25-year-old man who falls in love with a woman who trains killer whales.

The film competed for the Palme d'Or at the 2012 Cannes Film Festival and received positive early reviews and a ten-minute standing ovation at the end of its screening. It was a critical and box office hit in France and was nominated for a Screen Actors Guild Award, two Golden Globes, two BAFTA Awards, three Magritte Awards, and nine César Awards, winning four, including Most Promising Actor for Matthias Schoenaerts.

Plot
Alain van Versch, an unemployed father in his mid 20s known as Ali, arrives in Antibes, southern France, to look for work to support his young son Sam. Having no money, he crashes with his sister Anna, who already has her own share of problems with money and temporary employment.

Ali gets a job as a bouncer in a nightclub but still keeps his passion burning for fighting. On a typical evening in the night club, Ali meets Stéphanie and escorts her safely to her home after she is injured in a brawl at the club. She works at a local marine tourist park. She suffers an accident during a show and wakes up in the hospital to realize that her legs have been amputated.

Ali meets a guy at work who informs him about a kick boxing fixture he can earn money from. Stéphanie, now in a wheelchair and trying to adjust to her life without legs, is deeply depressed and gives Ali a call. Ali visits her and takes her to a beach where Stéphanie forgets her self-consciousness and feels freedom when Ali carries her out to the ocean to swim.

Over a period of time, Ali and Stéphanie spend a lot of time together, and Stéphanie starts to feel better about herself while in Ali's company. She gets artificial limbs and starts to walk again. Stéphanie accompanies Ali to his mixed martial arts fights and is surprised to learn he has a son.

After a frank discussion, Ali offers to have sex with Stéphanie to help her adjust to her new body. Their friendship evolves to include casual sex, although Stéphanie prevents deeper intimacy by telling Ali that there will be no kissing during their encounters.

Ali, Stéphanie, and some friends visit the same night club where Ali used to work. Ali goes to the dance floor and flirts with a girl as Stéphanie watches curiously. Ali goes away with the girl, leaving a surprised and dejected Stéphanie with other friends. A man at the bar tries to kiss her but she backs away from him, revealing her prosthetic legs. Looking down at her aluminum legs in her skirt, the man apologizes to her and Stéphanie flies into a rage, throwing a glass and attacking the man. She has to be escorted out of the club.

The next day Stéphanie sullenly questions Ali about their relationship status. She tells him that if they continue having casual sex, they have to respect each other's feelings and be more discreet about their other involvements. Their intimacy increases and Stéphanie, letting down her guard, kisses Ali, igniting true intimacy. Stéphanie also begins managing Ali's bets for his fighting after his manager leaves town.

Anna is fired from her job when the managers realize she has been taking home expired food products. Anna blames Ali for this, as Ali was involved in an odd job where he installed spy cameras in work areas. He does this at the direction of the management to spy on the activities of their employees. This results in a standoff between Ali and Anna's partner, who demands he move out and not come back.

Ali, feeling guilty and rejected, leaves town without a word to Stéphanie. She is hurt to be left behind. Sam stays with Anna while Ali goes to a combat sports training facility near Strasbourg, losing touch with Stéphanie.

Anna's partner, with her permission, drops off Sam to visit for a day with Ali at the training facility. It is winter and Ali and Sam play in the snow on a frozen lake. A weak spot on the frozen lake cracks and Sam falls through the ice, swiftly losing consciousness. He is submerged in the icy waters as Ali turns away momentarily distracted by a call of nature. It takes Ali a while to realize that Sam has fallen through. Once he spots the hole and sees Sam under the ice of the frozen lake, Ali releases a desperate volley of punches to break the surface and is finally able to pull the unconscious boy out. In the process, Ali fractures almost every bone in his hands.

After carrying Sam to the hospital, Ali stays at the boy's bed while he's in a coma. Sam survives, coming out of his coma. Stéphanie, who calls after hearing about Sam's accident, speaks to Ali at the hospital. Ali breaks down while talking to Stéphanie on the phone and confesses his love for her.

As Ali narrates, he explains how broken bones normally heal stronger than before, but he knows the pain will return in his hands.

After some time passes, Ali is shown celebrating a fight victory in Warsaw as Stéphanie happily watches. After the celebration of the win, Ali and Stéphanie take Sam by the hand and lead him out through the revolving door of a hotel.

Cast
 Marion Cotillard as Stéphanie
 Matthias Schoenaerts as Ali
 Armand Verdure as Sam
 Corinne Masiero as Anna
 Céline Sallette as Louise
 Bouli Lanners as Martial
 Mourad Frarema as Foued
 Jean-Michel Correia as Richard
 Yannick Choirat as Simon

Production
The film was produced by Why Not Productions for €15.4 million. It was co-produced with France 2 Cinéma, Page 114 and the Belgian company Les Films du Fleuve. Filming started on 4 October 2011 and lasted eight weeks. Locations were used in Antibes, Cannes, Belgium, Paris, northern France, and Brussels. To prepare for the role, Cotillard took swimming lessons and spent a week at Marineland to learn how to direct whales. Explaining how the team adjusted to Stéphanie having no legs, Cotillard told: "When we did the first costume fitting, we had to try those pants that were empty of my legs and I had to fold my legs in the wheelchair. That image was so powerful that we kept it throughout the movie. And also we worked with amazing CGI guys."

The special effects were provided by the French company Mikros Image. One of the key methods used was to have Cottilard wear green knee length socks. The legs below her knees were then erased by computer or replaced with the image of prosthetic lower legs.

Release

The film premiered on 17 May 2012 in competition at the 65th Cannes Film Festival. It was released in France and Belgium through UGC Distribution the same day. StudioCanal UK acquired the British distribution rights, and the film was released in the UK on 2 November 2012. It opened in the United States through Sony Pictures Classics on 23 November 2012.

Critical reception
The film was screened at the 2012 Cannes Film Festival and received early positive critical reactions. Rotten Tomatoes gives the film a score of 82% based on 165 reviews, with a weighted average of 7.5/10. The site's critical consensus states, "Surging on strong performances from Marion Cotillard and Matthias Schoenaerts, Rust and Bone is as vibrant and messily unpredictable as life itself." Metacritic gave the film a rating of 73/100, based on 39 reviews.

HitFix praised Audiard "for the way he takes melodramatic convention and bends it to his own particular sensibility, delivering a powerful tale about the reminders we all carry of the pains that have formed us" and found Cotillard's work "incredible, nuanced and real."

Peter Bradshaw of The Guardian gave the film a four-star rating out of five, writing Rust and Bone is "a passionate and moving love story which surges out of the screen like a flood tide" and "its candour and force are matched by the commitment and intelligence of its two leading players."

Time's Mary Corliss found that the romance is "sometimes engrossing, sometimes exasperating" and that the cinematography recalls Kings Row and An Affair to Remember." Corliss also wrote, "Schoenaerts exudes masculinity that is both effortless and troubled" while "Cotillard demonstrates again her eerie ability to write complex feelings on her face, as if from the inside, without grandstanding her emotions" and added, "her strong, subtle performance is gloriously winning on its own."

Michael Phillips of the Chicago Tribune, thought Schoenaerts' sensitive-brute instincts recall Marlon Brando and Tom Hardy.

Critic A. O. Scott of The New York Times called the film "a strong, emotionally replete experience, and also a tour de force of directorial button pushing."

Roger Ebert, who did not review the film upon its original release, later added it to his "Great Films" series and gave four stars.

Cate Blanchett wrote a review for Variety praising Marion Cotillard's performance in the film, describing it as "simply astonishing", stating that "Marion has created a character of nobility and candour, seamlessly melding herself into a world we could not have known without her. Her performance is as unexpected and as unsentimental and raw as the film itself."

Box office
In France, Rust and Bone was released to 394 screens, where it debuted at number one at the box office and sold a total of 1,930.536 million tickets.
The film grossed a total of $25.8 million worldwide.

Awards and nominations

See also
 2012 in film
 Cinema of France
 Cinema of Belgium
 Disability in the arts
 List of mixed martial arts films
 List of films featuring mental disorders

References

External links 
 
 
 
 
 
 

2012 films
2012 romantic drama films
2010s French films
2010s French-language films
Belgian romantic drama films
Best Film, London Film Festival winners
Films set in France
Films set on the French Riviera
Films about amputees
Films about disability
Films based on short fiction
Films based on works by Canadian writers
Films directed by Jacques Audiard
Films scored by Alexandre Desplat
Films set in amusement parks
Films shot in Belgium
Films shot in Brussels
Films shot in France
Films whose director won the Best Director Lumières Award
Films with screenplays by Jacques Audiard
Films with screenplays by Thomas Bidegain
French romantic drama films
Mixed martial arts films
Sony Pictures Classics films
StudioCanal films